My Valet is a 1915 short comedy film written, produced, and directed by Mack Sennett and starring Raymond Hitchcock, Sennett, and Mabel Normand.  The film was released by the Keystone Film Company and Triangle Distributing with a running time of 33 minutes. It was released on November 7, 1915 in the United States. The movie is in black and white and produced in English. A print exists.

Cast
 Raymond Hitchcock as John Jones
 Mack Sennett as John's Valet
 Mabel Normand as Mabel Stebbins
 Fred Mace as French Count
 Frank Opperman (actor) as Hiram Stebbins
 Alice Davenport as Mrs. Stebbins

References

External links
 My Valet in the New York Times
 
 My Valet at Turner Classic Movies
 My Valet in Looking for Mabel Normand

Films directed by Mack Sennett
Films produced by Mack Sennett
1915 films
1915 comedy films
American black-and-white films
Keystone Studios films
Triangle Film Corporation films
American silent short films
Silent American comedy films
1910s English-language films
1910s American films